Prunus argentea, sometimes called the silver almond, is a species of wild almond found in the Levant, Turkey, Iraq and western Iran. It is a thorny shrub 0.5 to 3m tall, with rough gray or brown bark. Its leaves are silvery white due to a covering of pubescent hairs. The leaves have a 1-5 mm petiole and the leaf blades are 10 to 44 mm long and 10 to 23 mm wide. Its inflorescences have red hypanthia and sepals, and pale pink or pink petals. The flowers are borne on a pedicel about 1 to 3mm long, which lengthens to 2 to 7mm when the fruit is fully developed. It is found growing in a variety of habitats; open oak woodlands, rocky slopes, dry silted areas, and steep banks of streams, at 500 to 2000m above sea level. A genetic study showed that its closest relative is probably Prunus haussknechtii.

Uses
In warmer areas of Europe it is occasionally cultivated as an ornamental garden plant for its fragrant rose-pink flowers and attractive foliage, but it must be planted in a protected spot for best results.

References

 

argentea
Flora of Iran
Flora of Iraq
Flora of Lebanon
Flora of Syria
Flora of Turkey
Plants described in 1922
Ornamental trees